Bibble is a digital imaging program for multiple platforms by Bibble Labs, designed to assist photographers in post-production work and efficient optimization of images created in raw image formats. After Bibble was acquired by Corel, it was rebranded as Corel AfterShot Pro.

Bibble 5 
Bibble 5 is an upgrade to Bibble 4 with the intent of cleaning up and rewriting some of the codebase, updating the GUI, and adding features to the platform.

Bibble 5.0 was released December 29, 2009 and the development was announced on September 22, 2006, and a preview version was released January 31. 2009.

The software exists in a Pro and a Lite package.

Added features in version 5 
 Image editing tools include selective editing and layers
 Asset management tools
 Metadata tools
 Faster processing and better support of multi-processor systems

Third-party plugins for Bibble 5 
 Harry - Black & White Converter Using a Color Equalizer 
 Sally - Color Enhancer Tool Using a Color Equalizer 
 iNDA - Simple Black/White Film Simulator 
 Lay - Layer transparency editor
 SplitToni - Split toning for highlights and shadows
 Sean Puckett Plugins - Coming soon, most of the best Sean Puckett Bibble 4 plugins for Bibble 5
 Ghost Writer - Text or logo overlays
 Grid - Overlay a grid pattern over an image

Added features in version 5.1 
Bibble 5.0 shipped with some functionality missing which Bibble 4 supported, but Bibble 5.1 adds the following features (and more). Additionally, a lite version is available.

 Heal & Clone brush
 Perfectly Clear
 Web Gallery output
 Auto-Contrast feature
 Ability to install third-party plugins
 Additional support and features to Bibble's plugin SDK
 Added support for additional cameras
 Added lens calibration parameters for various lenses.
 Numerous issues resolved.

Built-in plugins for Bibble 5.1 
 Black And White - Black & White with Spot Color

Bibble 4 
Bibble 4 was supported from October 2004 with their initial release of Bibble 4.0 up until May 2008 when the last version, 4.10, was released.  After which no more bug fixes or cameras were added to it and the project was basically closed while Bibble 5 development was ongoing.  Bibble 4 is considered deprecated at this point and is no longer supported or sold.

Features from version 4 
 RAW conversion.
 Post-processing of RAW and JPEG images; e.g. white balance setting, exposure, contrast, fill-light, etc.
 Plug-in architecture.
 Color management, courtesy of ColorFlow.
 Noise reduction, courtesy of Picturecode Noise Ninja.
 Shadow and highlight enhancement, courtesy of Athentech Perfectly Clear.

See also 
Adobe Bridge
Adobe Photoshop Lightroom
Apple Aperture
Corel AfterShot Pro (Bibble successor)
Darktable
LightZone
RawTherapee

References

Raster graphics editors
Photo software
Image organizers
Raw image processing software